PSM Makassar Putri (English: PSM Makassar Women's), is an Indonesia professional Women's football club based in Makassar, Indonesia. Founded in 2019, the club is affiliated with men's professional association football club PSM Makassar. It currently plays in the Liga 1 Putri, the top women's league in Indonesia.

History
In July 2019, PSM Makassar announced their commitment to take part in the inaugural season of Liga 1 Putri, a first professional women's football competition in Indonesia and formed 25 players including 3 players taken from Palembang, Indonesia. The player was selected by trial match by selection campaign 3 days in a row at Telkom Pettarani football field in Makassar.

The teams also did some trial match in same field with local U-15 Man football teams after completed players selection.

Players

Current squad

Club officials

Coaching staff

References

External links
 

PSM Makassar Putri
PSM Makassar Putri
PSM Makassar Putri
PSM Makassar Putri
Women's football clubs in Indonesia